Johnny Wayne (born Louis Weingarten; May 28, 1918 – July 18, 1990) was a Canadian comedian and comedy writer best known for his work as part of the comedy duo Wayne and Shuster alongside Frank Shuster.

The son of a successful clothing manufacturer who spoke several languages and the eldest of seven children, Johnny Wayne was born in downtown Toronto and attended Harbord Collegiate Institute, where he met his future comedy partner, and later attended the University of Toronto.

Wayne and Shuster began working together in the 1930s and continued their successful collaboration on stage, radio, and television until Wayne's death from brain cancer in 1990.  He is buried at Holy Blossom Cemetery, in his home town of Toronto.

Wayne was a curling enthusiast and was a commentator alongside Alex Trebek and Doug Maxwell during the 1968 CBC Curling Championship.

He also had musical talents and was a successful songwriter in the 1950s, including co-writing Bobby Gimby's 1958 hit "Jimbo". In 1964 he recorded the song "Charlottetown", which he wrote and sang for the Canadian Confederation Centennial.

He married Beatrice Lokash, in 1946. They were married until her death from cancer in 1980. Their children are historian Michael Wayne, columnist and songwriter Jamie Wayne, and television sports producer Brian Wayne.

See also 
List of notable brain tumor patients

References

External links

1918 births
1990 deaths
Canadian television personalities
Canadian male television actors
Canadian male radio actors
Canadian male stage actors
Jewish Canadian comedians
Jewish Canadian male actors
University of Toronto alumni
Male actors from Toronto
Curling broadcasters
Deaths from brain cancer in Canada
Curlers from Toronto
Comedians from Toronto
20th-century Canadian male actors
Canadian sketch comedians
20th-century Canadian comedians